Ryan-Mark Parsons (born 4 April 2000) is a British media personality, columnist, and commentator. Parsons is best known for being the youngest-ever candidate on the BBC One reality series The Apprentice (2019) and starring in the tenth series of E4's Celebs Go Dating (2022).

Parsons has also featured in viral and controversial debates on Good Morning Britain and GB News. Following several appearances on television and radio, in September 2020 he was named a columnist for the Daily Star, a British tabloid. Parsons starred in Celebrity Eating with My Ex (2021) and Celebrity Hot Property (2022), both on BBC Three.

In 2022, Parsons started presenting for boohooMAN and Channel 4 in digital series.

Early life 
Parsons was born on 4 April 2000 in London, United Kingdom. He was educated at Babington House School, a private school in Chislehurst, southeast London, and chose not to go to university. Before his media career, Parsons was a Brand Ambassador for Gucci within Harrods; alongside multiple internships at the Palace of Westminster, Matrix Chambers, 5 King's Bench Walk, AIG and NHS.

Career

2019—2020: The Apprentice and newspaper column 
Parsons joined The Apprentice, aged 19, as the youngest-ever candidate since the show began in 2005. Parsons' performance was praised by Sean O'Grady, Associate Editor of The Independent, stating the "cherubic Ryan-Mark Parsons is the real winner of this series". Similarly in The Telegraph, Anita Singh wrote: "Technically, there are a dozen contestants in the show. Really, there are only three: Thomas Skinner and Lottie Lion, and Ryan-Mark".

During Week Six, Parsons tested one of the rollercoasters at Thorpe Park, which caused thousands of viewers to react online. According to Hello!, 13,000 Twitter mentions and 10,000 hashtags were used, which made this scene one of the most talked about TV moments of 2019.

Parsons later appeared on The Apprentice: You're Fired! hosted by Tom Allen on BBC Two, alongside guests Dominic Holland, Tomeka Empson and Claudine Collins.

In 2020, Parsons featured in The Apprentice Best Bits, which was a six-part compilation series across fifteen series of the show. It was created to replace the 2020 series which was cancelled due to the coronavirus pandemic.

Parsons was fired 'with regret' in Week Eight of The Apprentice and the episode overall gained 6.6 million viewers. In his exit interviews, Parsons caused controversy after calling fellow candidates "desperate". Weeks following the series, Parsons had several altercations with fellow contestant Lottie Lion, such as when she criticised Parsons for charging fans for photos. Around a similar time, Parsons was hospitalised after he dropped £1000 caviar on his foot.

Various pictures surfaced of Parsons in December 2019, including at McDonald's in one of their London restaurants eating with a knife and fork. The story was subsequently reported by a large number of online newspapers and quickly became viral; popular US-based celebrity podcast Who? Weekly addressed the story in the episode: 'British reality star Ryan-Mark Parsons (he likes McDonald's)'.

On 23 January 2020, Parsons featured as a panellist in a Good Morning Britain debate over whether Australia should 'sell koala fur' to fund bushfire aid. Parsons made the argument that dead koala fur could be sold "to raise money for the injured animals in the rescue centres". This was criticised by animal rights activist, Wendy Turner Webster, who called his idea "grotesque", alongside presenter Susanna Reid labelling the suggestion as "sick". He was met with widespread public and media backlash from UK, Australian and New Zealand press, denouncing Parsons for his views.

At the start of September 2020, it was announced Parsons would join the Daily Star as a weekly columnist. The newspaper described him as "The Apprentice 2019's stand-out star" and "Often controversial, Parsons will bring his no-holds-barred opinions to Daily Star Online, talking about the biggest events in television". Parsons commented on the appointment, "As millions of people know from watching me on The Apprentice, I don't hold back and I'm super excited to be sharing my no-nonsense views with all of the readers. Sassy. Opinionated. Classic Ryan-Mark".

Since filming The Apprentice, Parsons featured on London Live in November 2019, speaking about his time on the show. He made several radio appearances in 2019, including Talkradio with Julia Hartley-Brewer, BBC Radio 5 Live: Wake Up to Money, and BBC Asian Network. In 2020, he appeared in several interviews on Hits Radio with Wes Butters and Fubar Radio with Bobby Norris.

2021—present: Media appearances, Celebs Go Dating and presenting 
Parsons appeared on the celebrity series of BBC Three's Eating with My Ex, which aired on 14 February 2021.

From March 2021, it emerged Parsons joined RT as a regular contributor, first featuring in a report on Oprah with Meghan and Harry. He has since presented a series of reports for the Russian-funded network, including covering Prince Harry's remarks on First Amendment to the United States Constitution.

On 3 June 2021, Parsons was also involved in a highly contentious debate with Richard Madeley, Charlotte Hawkins, and Dr Hilary Jones over whether under-30s should be punished for not taking the COVID-19 vaccine. Parsons argued under-30s should be punished, including bans from public venues. He claimed in his Daily Star column, death threats made after the debate were being investigated by the Metropolitan Police. The clip of the debate on Twitter has received over 500,000 views.

Parsons appeared on 'Andrew Neil Live' on 23 June 2021 to debate whether employers could demand staff to be fully vaccinated against coronavirus before being allowed to return to the office. Morgan Stanley announced staff would need to be double-vaccinated to enter their New York offices, to which Parsons argued in favour of this action during the debate.

ITV announced on 14 October 2021, Parsons would take part in a new digital series called Off The Table, hosted by Julie Adenuga. The channel said: "The new series will feature four hot topic 15 minute episodes which will be published across a month, including money, climate change, cancel culture and life after Covid".

Parsons has made various appearances on Talkradio with Cristo Foufas in 2021, including a segment called: Ryan-Mark's Rundown.

On 27 October 2021, Channel 4 announced Parsons would be taking part in the tenth series of Celebs Go Dating, alongside Ulrika Jonsson, Abz Love, Miles Nazaire, Chloe Brockett, Nikita Jasmine, Marty McKenna and Jessika Power. The series began airing in January 2022. Parsons and the show were criticised by The Independent's Sean O'Grady, calling Celebs Go Dating "sadistic" and claiming "he should be at school". According to dating agent Anna Williamson, Parsons received the worst score in Celebs Go Dating history and was put on hold from further dates.

On 14 February 2022, BBC announced Parsons would feature in the new celebrity series of Hot Property on BBC Three, which sees celebrities visit the homes of potential matches and eventually landing a blind date.

Parsons started presenting for boohooMAN in March 2022, alongside Love Island series seven contestant Toby Aromolaran and series eight winner Davide Sanclimenti, in a series of videos published online.

On 24 November 2022, Parsons announced a digital series for Channel 4 which is produced by Lime Pictures, which follows Parsons around the UK asking the British public about love and relationships.

Parsons, Gemma Collins and Luca Bish appeared in More than Daffs and Taffs, premiering on BBC iPlayer on March 2023 and on S4C's Hansh. The series follows reality stars challenge clichés attached to Wales in a lighthearted and comedic format, which is presented by Miriam Isaac.

Views 
Since Parsons' appearance on The Apprentice, he has expressed controversial viewpoints in his Daily Star column, on television and radio.

Fur trade 
Parsons supports the trade of animal fur. During his appearance on Good Morning Britain, he argued that the fur from koalas killed in the Australian bushfire could be used to "capitalise on and cater to" strong global demand for fur products. Also explaining the fur could be used for "a scarf for example. It could be something someone could wear".

Political correctness 
Parsons is anti-PC and has criticised the removal of shows like Come Fly With Me, which was pulled from streaming services Netflix and BBC iPlayer. He claimed there is a rise of a "snowflake movement" and is "excited we have [Spitting Image] on our screens that could offend people and pushes the boundaries beyond the sanitised and soporific 'entertainment' that we see nowadays".

Royal Family 
In an article published in response to Oprah with Meghan and Harry, Parsons supported the Queen and other members of the British royal family. He called the interview "Oscar-worthy" and "a shameless, callous, and brutal character assassination on the Royal Family", which aimed to "fatally destroy the reputation of the Queen".

Vaccinations 
Across several appearances in 2021, Parsons argued for vaccines against coronavirus. Debating on shows such as Good Morning Britain and GB News, Parsons strongly supported schemes that encouraged vaccinations against the virus.

Filmography

Television

Digital

Guest appearances 

The Apprentice: You're Fired! (20 November 2019)
 London Live (21 November 2019)
 Good Morning Britain (23 January 2020, 3 June 2021, 4 August 2021, 10 December 2021, 1 September 2022) – 5 episodes
GB News (23 June 2021, 10 October 2021, 13 October 2021, 30 January 2022, 18 February 2022, 6 May 2022, 20 May 2022, 29 May 2022, 25 June 2022, 21 August 2022, 17 September 2022, 5 November 2022, 18 November 2022, 10 December 2022, 25 December 2022, 1 January 2023, 20 January 2023) – 17 episodes
Married at First Sight: One Year On (29 August 2022)

Charity 
In December 2020, Parsons switched on the Christmas lights for the London Borough of Bromley, raising money for children's charity Go Beyond. He said, "I’m really looking forward to helping Bromley get festive and raising money for this brilliant cause".

It was announced on 28 June 2021, Parsons would become Go Beyond's patron, joining the likes of Kate Winslet, Jennifer Saunders and Alan Titchmarsh.

Publications 

 Daily Star (2020—present)

References

External links 

Official website
Ryan-Mark Parsons at IMDb
Ryan-Mark Parsons at Daily Star

2000 births
Television personalities from London
Living people
Businesspeople from London
The Apprentice (British TV series) candidates
British columnists
British journalists